Ochyraea is a genus of moss in the family Amblystegiaceae.

The genus name of Ochyraea is in honour of Ryszard Ochyra (born 1949) is a Polish bryologist. They have been found in Europe and across Russia.

The genus was circumscribed by Jiří Váňa in J. Bryol. vol.14 on page 261 in 1986.

Species
As accepted by The Plant List;
Ochyraea alpestris (Sw. ex Hedw.) Ignatov & Ignatova
Ochyraea cochlearifolia (Venturi) Ignatov & Ignatova
Ochyraea duriuscula (De Not.) Ignatov & Ignatova
Ochyraea mollis (Hedw.) Ignatov
Ochyraea montana (Lindb.) Ignatov & Ignatova
Ochyraea norvegica (Schimp.) Ignatov & Ignatova
Ochyraea smithii (Sw.) Ignatov & Ignatova
Ochyraea tatrensis, Vána

Note, the GBIF only accepts 2 species; Ochyraea duriuscula  and Ochyraea tatrensis .

References

Moss genera
Hypnales
Taxonomy articles created by Polbot